The 2019 Africa Men's Sevens was a rugby sevens tournament held in Johannesburg on 8–9 November 2019. It was the seventh championship in Africa Men's Sevens, a series that began in 2013. 

This tournament also served as a qualifying tournament for the 2020 Summer Olympics, with the champion team Kenya advancing.

The next two best-placed teams, Uganda and Zimbabwe were eligible to compete at a final Olympic qualifier tournament, as well as the 2020 World Rugby Sevens Challenger Series.

2018 Africa Regional Sevens – West

On 15–16 September 2018, eight teams took part in a regional tournament at Abidjan, Ivory Coast. The highest ranking teams, Ivory Coast and Nigeria, advanced based on their top two finishes. All times in Greenwich Mean Time (UTC±00:00).

Pool Stage

Pool A

Pool B

Knockout stage

Plate

Africa Sevens Qualification

Main tournament
All times in South African Standard Time (UTC+02:00)

Teams
The order of teams is based upon seeding from the prior year's tournament's placement.

Opening round

Pool stage

The teams were allocated to pools according to the results of the opening round:

Pool A: Winners of matches 1, 4, and 5, and the losing team with the smallest losing margin

Pool B: Winners of matches 2, 3, 6, and 7

Pool C: The losing teams with the 2nd, 5th, and 6th smallest losing margins

Pool D: The losing teams with the 3rd, 4th, and 7th smallest losing margins

Pool A (Championship)

Pool B (Championship)

Pool C (Consolation)

Pool D (Consolation)

Knockout stage

13th place play-off

Ninth place play-off

7th place play-off

5th place play-off

Olympic Qualification

Placings

Source:

References

Rugby sevens at the 2020 Summer Olympics – Men's qualification
2019
2019 rugby sevens competitions
2019 in African rugby union
2019 in South African rugby union
Africa Men's Sevens